Thomas Gill (born 16 May 1965 in Grimstad) is a Norwegian former football goalkeeper. Gill got five caps for Norway.

References

External links
 
 

Living people
1965 births
People from Grimstad
Association football goalkeepers
Norwegian footballers
Norway international footballers
FK Jerv players
SK Brann players
Vålerenga Fotball players
MSV Duisburg players
SK Sturm Graz players
F.C. Copenhagen players
Ayr United F.C. players
Fredrikstad FK players
IK Start players
FK Arendal players
Vejle Boldklub players
Strømsgodset Toppfotball players
Eliteserien players
Danish Superliga players
Austrian Football Bundesliga players
Bundesliga players
Norwegian expatriate sportspeople in Denmark
Norwegian expatriate sportspeople in Austria
Norwegian expatriate sportspeople in Germany
Norwegian expatriate sportspeople in Scotland
Norwegian expatriate footballers
Expatriate men's footballers in Denmark
Expatriate footballers in Austria
Expatriate footballers in Germany
Expatriate footballers in Scotland
Frederikshavn fI players
Sportspeople from Agder